Alexander Giannoulias (born March 16, 1976) is an American financier and politician who is the Illinois secretary of state. He previously served as the 72nd Illinois Treasurer from 2007 to 2011.

A Democrat, Giannoulias defeated Republican candidate State Senator Christine Radogno in November 2006 with 54 percent of the vote, becoming the first Democrat to hold the office in 12 years, at the age of 30. 

Giannoulias was a candidate in the 2010 elections for the seat in the United States Senate held by Roland Burris. Burris, who was appointed by Governor Rod Blagojevich to fill the seat vacated by Barack Obama following Obama's election as President of the United States, chose not to seek election. Giannoulias won the Democratic primary in February 2010, and narrowly lost the general elections in November 2010 to Republican Mark Kirk.

After 2010, Giannoulias mostly stepped back from public life, and served as Senior Director of BNY Mellon Wealth Management. On June 26, 2018, he was confirmed to the Chicago Public Library Board, marking his first return to public service since leaving the Treasurer's office. 

Giannoulias was elected secretary of state in the 2022 election, defeating Dan Brady to succeed longtime incumbent Jesse White.

Background
Giannoulias was born in Chicago, Illinois, to Greek immigrants. His mother, Anna, is from Chania, and his late father, Alexis, was from Kalavryta. He has two older brothers, Demetris and George. Giannoulias attended The Latin School of Chicago and then the University of Chicago before transferring to Boston University. Giannoulias graduated cum laude with a bachelor's degree in economics. He then moved to Greece to play basketball with Panionios B.C. for a year (1998–99).

Giannoulias had played basketball at The Latin School of Chicago, and played Division III basketball at the University of Chicago. He then played Division I basketball at Boston University.

After returning from Greece, Giannoulias attended Tulane University Law School. Upon earning his J.D. degree, Alexi returned to Chicago to help manage Broadway Bank, a community bank in Chicago's Edgewater neighborhood that was founded by his father in 1979.

Giannoulias served on the board of directors of the Community Banker's Association of Illinois Legislative Committee, the South Side/Wabash YMCA, and the Edgewater Chamber of Commerce. Giannoulias also founded and chaired the AG Foundation, a not-for-profit charity that donated money to treat child-related illnesses, curb poverty and assist disaster relief organizations.

He is married to Jo Terlato.

2006 campaign for Illinois State Treasurer

Although the state Democratic Party led by House Speaker Mike Madigan backed his opponent, Paul Mangieri, in the primary, Giannoulias was endorsed by U.S. Representatives Jan Schakowsky, Jesse Jackson, Jr., and by then-Senator Barack Obama.

The Chicago Sun-Times news group also endorsed Giannoulias in the general election, arguing that he would "bring valuable private enterprise experience from banking to the job" and praising his "creative" policy proposals like a securities lending program, improving Bright Start, and promoting green energy. Running on a campaign platform that emphasized comprehensive ethics reform for the Treasurer's office, Giannoulias won the March 2006 primary and went on to defeat Republican candidate Christine Radogno in the general election.

Actions in office

Ethics reform
On his first day as State Treasurer, Giannoulias "signed an executive order to enact the most comprehensive, widest-ranging ethics package of any elected official in the state", according to his official state website. "The order prohibits [the Treasurer] from accepting contributions from banks, Treasurer's Office employees and contractors who do business with the office."  He also moved to foreclose on two debt-ridden hotels built in the 1980s by politically connected insiders in Springfield and Collinsville.

Hartmarx
In 2009, Giannoulias worked to encourage Wells Fargo to cooperate in the sale of Chicago-based clothing manufacturer Hartmarx Corp., which was at risk of liquidation and had filed for Chapter 11 protection. The success of this sale with Giannoulias' support saved over 600 jobs at an Illinois Hartmarx factory that otherwise would have been closed.

Wells Fargo, a primary lender for Hartmarx, is also "the money custodian for the treasurer's office, holding its cash and other financial assets." Giannoulias publicly challenged Wells Fargo's obstruction of the sale, stating that "[Wells Fargo's] intention to liquidate Hartmarx rather than allow a sale to buyers intent on keeping the company running will significantly jeopardize the business relationship between Wells Fargo and the state of Illinois."

Giannoulias cited the fact Wells Fargo received over $25 billion in federal TARP bailout funds as further reason why the bank should have supported the sale of Hartmarx instead of pursuing the company's liquidation. In a public statement, Giannoulias said, "We expect companies that get state and federal taxpayer money to invest it in American jobs and American workers, not destroy companies that still have a chance to succeed."

Green Rewards
Giannoulias launched the "Green Rewards" program, which gives a $1,000 rebate to Illinois residents who purchase a new hybrid or other fuel-efficient vehicle.

Purchase of Israel Bonds 
In January 2009, the state of Illinois purchased $10 million worth of Israel Bonds. Giannoulias said: "This is a good way to safely diversify our portfolio, especially during a time when some of our other investment options aren't generating as much revenue because of the market fluctuations here in the United States." According to Giannoulias, the Israel Bonds will mature in three years with a 2.43% rate of return, compared to U.S. government bonds yielding a 1.51% return during the same period.

Scholarship programs 
In addition to revamping the Bright Start savings program, Giannoulias created several new scholarship programs for Illinois college students.

The Fallen Heroes Scholarship Program, which Giannoulias designed in a partnership with the Illinois Department of Veterans Affairs, awards an initial investment of $2,500 in college savings to children who have lost a parent in military service since 2001.

In 2008, Giannoulias announced the creation of the Bright Start Scholarship Program, which will award $3.5 million in need-based scholarships over 7 years, until 2015. More than 250 students received scholarships in 2008, the first year of the program. The scholarships were designed by Giannoulias as a public–private partnership, with the funding for the scholarships donated by a private firm at no cost to the state or taxpayers.  Giannoulias also developed the Cultivate Illinois Excellence in Agriculture scholarship in 2008. This program awards ten $2,000 scholarships each year to students pursuing degrees in agriculture-related fields.

Bright Start 

As Illinois Treasurer, Giannoulias was responsible for overseeing the Illinois' Bright Start college saving program. Bright Start provides parents with the opportunity to invest in a tax-free account to save for their children's college education.  Enrollees are eligible for several state tax benefits and can invest in various stock and bond options.  Before Giannoulias took office, SavingForCollege.com ranked Bright Start 47th out of 48 in the nation. Giannoulias helped reform the program, and Bright Start went from being one of the worst programs in the country to one of the best. Morningstar called the transformation "a Cinderella story."

In 2008, one of the twenty-one funds in Bright Start, Core Plus, began experiencing excessive losses and eventually lost 38% of its value. In the same year, the overall Bright Start program's benchmark grew by 5.4%. Within the Illinois Bright Start program, 2.5% of investors had invested their entire portfolios in Core Plus and suffered a 38% loss; others experienced smaller losses.

As the Associated Press reported, "It turns out the Oppenheimer team handling Core Plus — a team the company has now fired — was putting money into risky, complicated investments that tanked in 2008 amid the general financial meltdown."  In 2009, Oregon,  Nebraska,  New Mexico, Texas, Maine and Illinois all investigated OppenheimerFunds' handling of their college savings programs for impermissible investments and misconduct. Oppenheimer was selected to lead the program by Giannoulias' predecessor, former Illinois Treasurer Judy Baar Topinka, in December 2006, a month before Giannoulias took office.

After the credit markets collapsed in the fall, new contributions into the fund were halted on December 4, 2008. In January 2009, the treasurer's office announced that no further contributions would be made to the Core Plus fund and that the state would be investigating the losses.

According to the Associated Press, Illinois was the first state to take action.  In January 2009, at the request of Giannoulias, the Illinois Attorney General initiated its own probe of OppenheimerFunds, issuing subpoenas on the company. At the time, the losses attributable to OppenheimerFunds' impermissible investments were estimated to be "in excess of $85 million."

Despite the problem associated with OppenheimerFunds' handling of Core Plus, Bright Start remains a highly regarded 529 college savings program. In April 2009, Consumer Reports studied college savings programs across the country "to see how well they performed during last year's stock-market plunge." Consumer Reports "found five that are worthy of an A," and ranked Bright Start as one of the top five college savings programs in the nation. In April 2009, Money Magazine selected Bright Start as one of the "best low-risk 529 plans."  In December 2009, Kiplingers selected Bright Start as one of the best state 529 plans in the country, choosing it as the best plan for "low fees." Morningstar, Inc., which had previously ranked Bright Start in its top 5 in 2008, has acknowledged the issues relating to Core Plus but, citing Illinois' swift action in dealing with the issue, reported in 2009 that "the plan still holds plenty of appeal."

In December 2009, the Illinois Attorney General's Office and the Office of the State Treasurer announced that Illinois had reached a settlement with OppenheimerFunds.  Eligible accountholders who lost money in Core Plus would receive $77 million from OppenheimerFunds.  As the scope of the settlement was expanded during negotiations with OppenheimerFunds to include more accountholders, the total loss addressed by the settlement is $150 million.  The payout from this settlement brings the losses for the 2.5% of Bright Start investors who were fully invested in Core Plus down to 17%.

The Treasurer's Office used some of the investment fees from the Bright Start program to purchase a hybrid vehicle "so Bright Start staff have a way to travel the state and sign families up for the program" and used to promote other Treasurer's Office programs. The vehicle was never used for personal use by Giannoulias.

Other efforts as Treasurer 
Giannoulias started a pilot program in 2007 to sell the abandoned contents of safe deposit boxes on eBay, scrapping the state's annual live auctions.

Broadway Bank 

From 2002 to 2006, Giannoulias worked as a senior loan officer and vice president at Broadway Bank, a community bank founded by his father.  When he left the bank in 2006, it was one of the most profitable banks in Illinois. Four years later, on January 26, 2010, Broadway Bank entered into a consent decree with the FDIC that ordered Broadway to increase its capital. Two dozen small- to medium-sized banks in Illinois and nearly 200 banks nationwide have failed since the October 2008 economic crash.

Broadway Bank's struggling financial situation is due to delinquent real estate loans and foreclosed properties. From 2002 to 2006, Broadway's lending in construction and development loans increased sixfold, to $356 million.  During Giannoulias' tenure, Broadway also increased its brokered deposits, which generally command high interest rates. When Giannoulias left the bank in 2006, brokered deposits made up 80% of all deposits at Broadway.  When the housing market crashed in late 2008, commercial real estate loan performance deteriorated and Broadway Bank, which had focused its lending in real estate, suffered.

Nine percent of the value of the bad loans originated while Giannoulias was chief loan officer.:1

At the end of business on Friday, the Illinois Department of Financial and Professional Regulation, Division of Banking, seized Broadway Bank and appointed the Federal Deposit Insurance Corporation (FDIC) as receiver.  The FDIC in turn named MB Financial Bank as the institution receiving Broadway Bank's deposit accounts. The FDIC announced that it and MB Financial Bank would share $878.4 million in losses, for a cost of $394.3 million to the federal Deposit Insurance Fund.

Loans made by Broadway Bank 

Broadway Bank made real estate development loans to Tony Rezko, a political fundraiser and real estate developer who was later convicted of fraud and money laundering. Broadway Bank made these loans before Rezko was investigated, indicted, or convicted for any crimes, but not before the criminal conduct took place. Before his conviction, Rezko also received loans from other Chicago banks, including Bank of Chicago, First Bank and Trust of Illinois, GE Capital, Harris Trust and Savings, LaSalle Bank, and Manufacturers Bank.

Giannoulias himself did not make the Rezko loans.

Rezko defaulted on loans made by Broadway, and, in 2006 Broadway was the first bank to foreclose on one of Rezko's delinquent loans, forcing him to declare bankruptcy. Broadway Bank also refused to cover nine bad checks written by Rezko for a total of $450,000 in early 2008

Giannoulias never accepted campaign contributions from Rezko.

Broadway Bank also loaned money for real estate developments to Michael Giorango, who has been convicted for prostitution and bookmaking.  Giannoulias has stated that he was not part of the loan committee that approved the loans to Giorango.

2010 U.S. Senate campaign 

Giannoulias ran against Republican nominee Mark Kirk, Green Party nominee LeAlan Jones, and Libertarian nominee Mike Labno. As a candidate, Giannoulias pledged to create a "Senate Progressive Caucus", akin to the Congressional Progressive Caucus (CPC) in the House of Representatives.

On March 2, 2009, Giannoulias stated on CNBC that he was forming an exploratory committee in order to assess a potential candidacy for the US Senate in 2010. On July 26, 2009, he officially announced his candidacy for the United States Senate at the Hilton Chicago, the same place then-Senator Barack Obama endorsed Giannoulias for State Treasurer in 2006. He was introduced to the crowd by Congressman Bill Foster. He lost to Republican Congressman Mark Kirk.

Giannoulias was elected the Democratic nominee for US Senate in Illinois in the February 2, 2010, primary, with 39.0% of the vote. David H. Hoffman received 33.8% and Cheryle Jackson received 19.7%.

Endorsements
Giannoulias was endorsed by Planned Parenthood, the Service Employees International Union (SEIU), AFSCME, the AFL–CIO, the League of Conservation Voters, the Human Rights Campaign, the Chicago Sun-Times, and the Sierra Club (Planned Parenthood, the League of Conservation Voters, and the Human Rights Campaign had all supported Congressman Kirk in previous races).

On May 28, 2010, the Human Rights Campaign (HRC) endorsed Giannoulias, calling him "a strident supporter of LGBT equality – including supporting marriage equality, repeal of the Defense of Marriage Act, repeal of "Don't Ask, Don't Tell" and supporting an inclusive Employment Non-Discrimination Act."

Among his early endorsers were James Houlihan and Manny Flores. U.S. Senator Dick Durbin, the Assistant Majority Leader and second-highest ranking Democrat in the Senate, endorsed Giannoulias and served as the chairman of the Giannoulias campaign. President Obama expressed his support of Giannoulias' Senate bid and joined him on the campaign trail.

Controversies
During Giannoulias' bid for the senate he faced attacks on his credibility, mostly stemming from his connection to his family owned bank. Broadway bank was shuttered and seized by the federal government and was alleged to have ties to the mafia. However, Giannoulias opponent, Congressman Mark Kirk, faced his own slew of controversies regarding his military service.

Defeat
On November 2nd 2010 Congressman Mark Kirk beat Alexi Giannoulias for Illinois' open United States Senate seat with 48% of the vote, beating former Treasurer Giannoulias by a margin of 2%

2022 Illinois Secretary of State campaign

Giannoulias announced he would run for Illinois Secretary of State to succeed retiring incumbent Jesse White. On June 28, 2022, he won the Democratic primary On November 8, 2022, Giannoulias won the general election, defeating Republican Dan Brady.

References

External links
Illinois Secretary of State – official website
 Campaign website
 Alexi for Senate
 
 Campaign contributions at OpenSecrets.org

|-

|-

|-

|-

 

 

1976 births
American bankers
American men's basketball players
American people of Greek descent
Basketball players from Illinois
Boston University Terriers men's basketball players
Illinois Democrats
Illinois lawyers
Latin School of Chicago alumni
Living people
Schools of the Sacred Heart alumni
Panionios B.C. players
Politicians from Chicago
Secretaries of State of Illinois
State treasurers of Illinois
Tulane University Law School alumni